Secondary Highway 618, commonly referred to as Highway 618, is a provincially maintained secondary highway in the Canadian province of Ontario. It connects Olsen Mine and Madsen with the northern terminus of Highway 105 in the town of Red Lake. The  route was established in 1956, and has remained the same since then. It passes through a remote forested area, and encounters no communities of any significance outside of Red Lake. The route was assumed by the Department of Highways, predecessor to today's Ministry of Transportation of Ontario, in 1956, along with many other secondary highways in Ontario. The route has remained unchanged since then.

Route description 
Highway 618 is a short highway which serves to connect several mines and the community of Madsen with the northern terminus of Highway 105 in the town of Red Lake.
Owing to the geography of the area, the route serves through traffic and no residences or farms lie next to it.

The route begins at Olsen Mine Road and travels east-northeast through thick boreal forest. It meets a forestry road and Main Street towards Madsen. The highway passes north of Faulkenham Lake and travels parallel to a high-tension power line including the town of Redditt. Continuing northeast, Highway 618 zig-zags through the forest, then enters Red Lake, where it is also known as Howey Street. The route shares its eastern terminus with the northern terminus of Highway 105.

History 
Highway 618 was first assumed by the Department of Highways, predecessor to the modern Ministry of Transportation of Ontario in early 1956, along with several dozen other secondary highways, but was possibly maintained by the province as a development road prior to that.
The route has remained unchanged since then.

Major intersections 
The following table lists the major junctions along Highway 618. The entirety of the route is located within Kenora District.
{| class="wikitable" width="450px"
|-
!scope="col"|Location
!scope="col"|km
!scope="col"|Destinations
!scope="col"|Notes
|-
|Starratt-Olsen
|0.0
|Olsen Mine Road
|
|-
|Madsen
|1.3
|Main Street
|
|-
|rowspan="2"|Red Lake
|10.2
|Starratt Street
|
|-
|11.7
|
|

References 

618